This is a sortable list of games for the ZX Spectrum home computer. There are currently  games in this incomplete list.


Original run (1982–1994)

Homebrew

References

External links
Spectrum Computing, an up-to-date database of ZX Spectrum software

ZX Spectrum games, List of
 
ZX Spectrum